Landrush is a 1946 American Western film directed by Vernon Keays and starring Charles Starrett, Doris Houck, Smiley Burnette, Emmett Lynn, Bud Geary and Steve Barclay. The film was released on November 18, 1946, by Columbia Pictures.

Plot

Cast          
Charles Starrett as Steve Harmon / The Durango Kid
Doris Houck as Mary Parker
Smiley Burnette as Smiley Burnette
Emmett Lynn as Jake Parker
Bud Geary as Claw Hawkins
Steve Barclay as Caleb Garvey
Bob Kortman as Sackett
George Chesebro as Bill
Bud Osborne as Sheriff Jim Collins

References

External links
 

1946 films
American Western (genre) films
1946 Western (genre) films
Columbia Pictures films
American black-and-white films
Films directed by Vernon Keays
1940s English-language films
1940s American films